David Leslie Andrews,  (15 October 1952) is a British scientist appointed as Professor of Chemical Physics at the University of East Anglia, where he was the Head of Chemical Sciences and Physics, from 1996 to 1999.

Andrews and his research group are known for wide-ranging theory work on optical phenomena, developing quantum electrodynamical theory and symmetry principles for numerous applications including fluorescence,  and optical nanomanipulation. Andrews is also known for pioneering work on the quantum theory of intermolecular energy transfer, in which he developed the Unified Theory of energy transfer that accommodates both radiationless and radiative processes. He has also made other notable contributions to quantum optics and nonlinear optics, with many studies of chiral interactions including a prediction of the hyper–Rayleigh scattering effect, while studies of chirality and optical helicity led to his research group's many contributions to the theory of optical vortices.

Andrews is the author of over four hundred scientific papers and technical books. He has been instrumental in launching several international conference series, including a series of International Conferences on Optical Angular Momentum. Many others are conferences run by SPIE – the global society for optics and photonics, of which he is a Fellow member and 2021 President.  He is also a Fellow of the Royal Society of Chemistry, the Institute of Physics, and the Optical Society of America.  In his spare time he is an active member of his local church, he paints landscapes, and he writes occasional poetry.

Education
David Andrews attended Colfe's Grammar School, Lee, London, U.K. from 1963 to 1970. He graduated (1st Class Hons) in Chemistry, from University College London in 1973. He then obtained a PhD in theoretical chemistry from the same university, in 1976.

Research
From 1976 to 1978, Andrews was an Associate Research Assistant in the Department of Mathematics and Honorary Research Associate in Department of Chemistry, in University College London. In 1978, he became Science Research Council Postdoctoral Fellow and in 1979 he joined the University of East Anglia as a Lecturer. Andrews was promoted to Senior Lecturer in 1991 and to Reader in 1994. He was appointed Professor of Chemical Physics in 1996.

Awards and recognition
2022: Immediate Past-President of SPIE
2021: President of SPIE
2020: President-Elect SPIE
2019: Vice-president SPIE
2016: Elected Fellow of The Optical Society
2005: Elected Fellow of SPIE
1999: Elected Fellow of the Institute of Physics  
1988: Elected Fellow of the Royal Society of Chemistry

Works

References

External links
.

1952 births
Living people
Fellows of Optica (society)
Fellows of SPIE
Fellows of the Royal Society of Chemistry
Fellows of the Institute of Physics
Academics of the University of East Anglia